Quality Comics was a comic book company from the Golden Age of Comic Books. It operated from 1937 to 1956 and sold many anthology comic books that starred superheroes, many of which were adopted by DC Comics when they purchased Quality Comics, and others were not, entering the public domain.

#711 
#711 was created by George Brenner and published by Quality Comics. #711 first appeared in Police Comics #1 (August 1941) and lasted until #16 (January 1943), when he was killed.

Daniel Dyce was a District Attorney who was almost an exact twin of his friend, Jacob Horn. Jacob was in prison, but wanted to see his wife give birth, so Daniel agreed to become a prisoner while Jacob was with his wife. However, Jacob is killed in a car crash on the way to the hospital, so Daniel was stuck in jail. Daniel was able to tunnel himself free, but instead of escaping, he decided to return to his cell. Each night he uses his tunnel to go outside and  fight crime, then returns before the morning. Dyce adopts the name #711, a reference to his prisoner number. One of his enemies is the costumed villain Brickbat.

After two years of adventures Daniel Dyce was killed by the mobster Oscar Jones. The hero Destiny sees this take place, and starts his crime fighting career when #711 died, replacing his feature in Police Comics.

Like many early comic book heroes, #711 did not wear a traditional costume but rather was modeled after the traditional pulp magazine heroes. He wore a green cape, a brown business suit, and a wide-brimmed fedora which cast his eyes in shadow.  #711's trademark was a calling card made of a mirror with bars painted over it; when an unlucky criminal would look at the card, they would see themselves behind bars.

Brenner replaced #711 with a new hero — a mysterious figure who discovers that he has the powers of clairvoyance and teleportation, and uses them to bring 711's murderer to justice. The new hero christens himself "Destiny", and continues the series.

Following the Golden Age, many of the Quality Comics characters were purchased by DC Comics, while others lapsed into the public domain. DC has used #711 only once in their publications, a Millennium Edition reprint of his first appearance.

Abdul the Arab 

Abdul the Arab first appeared in Smash Comics #1. Abdul is a Arab sheikh who is aligned with the British intelligence agencies in the Middle East. He was originally created by Vernon Henkel.

Black Condor

Blackhawk

Black Star 
She was an unnamed female criminal who first appeared in Modern Comics #101 (September 1950) and was an adversary of the Blackhawks.

Black X 
Black X (Richard Spenser) is a secret agent who first appeared in Quality's Feature Funnies #13 (1938). In August 1939, Black X moved from Feature to Smash Comics. In the first five issues of Smash Comics, the character was called "Black Ace"; then he reverted to the previous name. His sidekick is Batu, a telepathic Indian.

According to Jess Nevins' Encyclopedia of Golden Age Superheroes, his enemies include "the foreign spy Baron Basil, the Death Squadron and their Suicide Torpedoes, Proxoss the Revolutionary, the Hunchback of Notre Dame, the Legion of Living Bombs, and the femme fatale Madame Doom."

In 1939, Black X tangled with the seductive spy Madame Doom, and over the course of several stories, he fell in love with her, wondering if he could betray his country to be with the agent of an enemy nation. Discovering that she's building an army of exploding human bombs in a 1940 story, Black X renounced his affection, and Madame Doom apparently died in an explosion—although she continued to return periodically through 1943.

The character continued in Smash Comics until issue #85 (Oct 1949).

Blue Tracer 
Blue Tracer first appeared in Military Comics #1 (August 1941). It is also the name of his super-vehicle, which can become a tank, airplane, or submarine.

Blue Tracer first appeared in issues 1 through 16 of Military Comics. The character was acquired by DC, along with the rest of Quality Comics' properties in the 1950s. However, the character had lapsed into public domain before that.

Blue Tracer's origin story is told in his first appearance, in Military Comics #1. William "Wild Bill" Dunn is an American engineer working with the army in a secluded section of Ethiopia. While working, his team is attacked by a group of supernatural beings named the M'bujies. The M'bujies wound Dunn and kill his teammates. Dunn is rescued by "Boomerang" Jones, an Australian soldier who had been given up for dead and is now fighting his own private war against the Nazis. After Dunn regains his strength, the two men create a super-vehicle out of captured Nazi equipment that they name the Blue Tracer. It can become a tank, airplane, or submarine. They then use it to destroy the M'bujies and escape the jungle. The two travel the world and fight the Axis forces during the rest of the war, with Dunn at the head and Jones as his sidekick.

According to Jess Nevins' Encyclopedia of Golden Age Superheroes, the Blue Tracer's foes "range from Nazis to the Yellow Butcher of Koko Nor to Dr. Schwein, who has created a regeneration formula for German soldiers."

The last appearance of the Blue Tracer was in Military Comics #16, according to the Grand Comics Database.

Neither Dunn nor Jones have any superpowers, but Dunn is a good fighter and skilled engineer. The Blue Tracer allows Dunn and Jones to travel on land, under the sea, and in the air. It has many weapons, and can deflect small arms fire easily.

Creator Fred Guardineer drew a detailed half-page diagram of the vehicle in the fourth issue.

The Blue Tracer would later appear many years later in the 2018 Freedom Fighters series. The vehicle is portrayed as the Freedom Fighters mobile base and is piloted by a man named Cache.

Bozo the Iron Man

Captain Triumph

Clock

Doll Girl

Doll Man

Firebrand

Human Bomb

Invisible Hood

Jester

Kid Eternity

Lady Luck

Madame Fatal

Magno the Magnetic Man  
Magno the Magnetic Man appeared in Quality Comics from 1940 to 1956. The character was created by Paul Gustavson. His first appearance was in Smash Comics #13 (August 1940). He was one of the characters that were purchased by DC Comics when Quality Comics sold their assets. However, the copyright on these comics expired before that, making them public domain.

Tom Dalton was a lineman for an electric company until he was shocked and killed by 10,000 D.C. volts of electricity. He was brought back to life by a coworker, who used 10,000 A.C. volts. Tom Dalton became Magno. He was powered by the very electricity that saved his life, and he used it to fight crime with his magnetic and electrical abilities. He sometimes ran out of power and had to recharge himself by touching exposed wires. He was featured in Smash Comics until issue #21 (April 1941). He then moved to two Ace Magazines comics: Super-Mystery Comics, from v1 #1 to v6 #4 (July 1940–February 1947, 34 issues); and to Four Favorites, from issue #1 to #26 (Sept 1941-Nov 1946).

In his fourth story, Magno was joined by a sidekick—Davey, a young man with the powers of magnetic attraction and repulsion. Davey was the little brother of female private eye Carole Landis. Davey's powers had no origin in particular. Magno and Davey became partners, and worked for the government on secret missions.

According to Jess Nevins' Encyclopedia of Golden Age Superheroes, "Magno and Davey take on a variety of foes: human-sacrificing Aztec cultists, the four-armed, fanged Yellow Peril Professor Octopus, and Magno and Davey's recurring foe, the Clown, who works out of a traveling cricus and uses hyper-intelligent trained rats to carry out his crimes".

Magno was briefly revived in 1984 for two issues of All-Star Squadron, #31 and 32 (March–April 1984). In this story, Magno is contacted by Uncle Sam hours before the attack on Pearl Harbor to join the Freedom Fighters and defend the base. Magno accepts, and dies while fighting the Japanese, along with the other members of the Freedom Fighters. While most of the other members are later revealed to have survived, Magno is not. He's also seen in Secret Origins vol 2 #26 (May 1988), in the origin story for Miss America.

Manhunter

Marmaduke Mouse 

Marmaduke was a talking animal character created by Ernie Hart in 1944 and was Quality Comics' third longest-running title behind Blackhawk and Plastic Man. He first appeared in Hit Comics #35 where he was a minor character for several issues, eventually receiving his own series in 1946 which ran for 65 issues, until December 1956. According to the Encyclopedia of Comic Books and Graphic Novels, the series "was, in the beginning, were solidly drawn and reasonably funny, but lacked a convincing sense of action and character."

Merlin the Magician

Midnight

Miss America

Mouthpiece 
Mouthpiece first appeared in Police Comics #1 (August 1941), along with the heroes Plastic Man, Firebrand, and the Human Bomb, and lasted until #13. He was created by Fred Guardineer. Although, like all Quality characters, he is ostensibly owned by DC Comics after it acquired Quality's assets, he lapsed into public domain prior to the said acquisition.

Bill Perkins was a District Attorney who thought that the law was not strong enough. He decided to don a costume to apprehend criminals that escaped justice, and became the Mouthpiece. He carries a gun and handcuffs. He was ruthless, and was prepared to kill criminals when he needed to. Once, he even threw a harpoon into the back of a fleeing opponent (he'd run out of bullets), rather than let him get away.

He was a skilled brawler and marksman, an above-average detective and an expert in criminal law.

Neon the Unknown

Plastic Man

Phantom Lady

Quicksilver

Ray

Red Bee

Red Torpedo

Spider Widow

The Spirit 

Now popularly known as Will Eisner's The Spirit aka: Denny Colt, was a Golden Age of Comic Books superhero. He first appeared in Iowa's Register and Tribune Syndicate periodical as a comic insert in June 2 of 1940. Almost 2 years later in September 1942, He makes his First actual comic book appearance in Police Comics #11 (it reprints his 1940 origin-strip #1). The Spirit in later issues of Police comics goes on to team-up with Jack Cole's Plastic Man. The Spirit's Quality Comics appearances end in issue #102 (November 1950).

Stormy Foster

Uncle Sam

Wildfire

Wonder Boy

References

External links 
Archive of  "Quality Comic Group: A Brief History" at the Connecticut Historical Society. Original page.
Quality's Superheroes & Villains Encyclopedia

 
Quality